The 2022–23 season is the 106th season in the history of S.C.U. Torreense and their first season back in the second division of Portuguese football. The club are participating in the Liga Portugal 2, the Taça de Portugal, and the Taça da Liga. The season covers the period from 1 July 2022 to 30 June 2023.

Players

Pre-season and friendlies

Competitions

Overall record

Liga Portugal 2

League table

Results summary

Results by round

Matches 
The league fixtures were announced on 5 July 2022.

Taça de Portugal

Taça da Liga

References 

Torreense